The Sweat-Comings Company House is a historic two-family house at 10–12 Powell Street in Richford, Vermont.  Built in 1909, it is a rare surviving example of an early company-built boarding house.  It  was sold into private ownership in 1924, and is a good local example of vernacular Colonial Revival architecture.  It was listed on the National Register of Historic Places in 2004.

Description and history
The Sweat-Comings Company House stands in the Richford's main village, on the south side of Powell Street, a residential street just off Main Street.  The house is a two-story wood-frame structure, with a hip roof and clapboarded exterior.  Its main facade is three bays wide, with sash windows in the upper floor, and sash windows flanking a pair of entrances in the center bay on the ground floor.  A single-story hip-roofed porch extends across the front, with a shingled skirt and round posts.  A gable rises in the roof above the central bay, with a small window at its center.  The interior retains a number of original finishes, including hardwood floors, trim elements, plaster walls, and a French door in the downstairs unit.

The house was built in 1909, after a fire swept through Richford in 1907, destroying part of its downtown and the Sweat-Comings factory complex, located between Powell Street and the Missisquoi River.  The factory complex was rebuilt in 1909, and this house was built next to it, on the site of a tenement house that had also been burned.  According to local histories, this house was at first home to the factory's night watchman, and also served as a boarding house for single workers.  It was moved in 1924 to its present location, roughly across the street from its original position.  An attached garage was moved to a different location in Richford.

See also
National Register of Historic Places listings in Franklin County, Vermont

References

Houses on the National Register of Historic Places in Vermont
National Register of Historic Places in Franklin County, Vermont
Colonial Revival architecture in Vermont
Houses completed in 1909
Houses in Franklin County, Vermont
Buildings and structures in Richford, Vermont